Aegon Targaryen refers to multiple characters in George R. R. Martin's A Song of Ice and Fire fantasy franchise:

 Aegon I Targaryen, the first Targaryen king in the backstory of A Song of Ice and Fire
 Aegon II Targaryen, featured in Fire & Blood and its TV adaptation House of the Dragon
 Aegon V Targaryen, also known as Aegon the Unlikely, featured in the Tales of Dunk and Egg stories
 Aegon VI Targaryen, the son of Rhaegar Targaryen and Elia Martell in the backstory of A Song of Ice and Fire, and a character in A Dance with Dragons (2011)
 Jon Snow (character), the secret son of Rhaegar Targaryen and Lyanna Stark in the TV adaptation Game of Thrones, born Aegon Targaryen

See also
Aemon Targaryen